Haixinsha Island is an island in Haizhu District, Guangzhou, Guangdong, China. It is located between Luoxi Bridge and Xinguang Bridge. It is at the south of Lijiao Station of Haizhu Island and the north of Luoxi Island of Panyu District.

See also 
Haixinsha Island (Tianhe District): another island with the same name in Tianhe District, Guangzhou

References

Haizhu District
Islands of Guangzhou